Somsak Keaokanta (born 23 July 1939) is a Thai long-distance runner. He competed in the men's 5000 metres at the 1964 Summer Olympics.

References

1939 births
Living people
Athletes (track and field) at the 1964 Summer Olympics
Somsak Keaokanta
Somsak Keaokanta
Place of birth missing (living people)